Scrabble is a board word game.

Scrabble may also refer to:

Related to the board game
 Scrabble (game show), an American television game show 1984–1990, 1993
 Scrabble (video game), the official computerized version, released in several versions since 1984, including:
 The Computer Edition of Scrabble, 1988, for Apple II, DOS, and Macintosh
 Scrabble 2007 Edition, for Nintendo DS

Other uses
 Scrabble, West Virginia, United States
 Marc Rzepczynski (b. 1985), nicknamed Scrabble, an American baseball player

See also
 Hardscrabble (disambiguation)
 Scrapple